Martin Svensson also known as Martin (born 11 March 1978) is a Swedish singer, author and musician.

Music
He started as a solo artist. His debut single "Rymdraket" from his 1997 debut album Pojkdrömmar. His biggest hit remains though "(Du är så) Yeah Yeah Wow Wow", a song he wrote himself and sang at Melodifestivalen 1999 in a bid to represent Sweden in the 1999 Eurovision Song Contest in Jerusalem. He finished 4th overall, but the single reached the top of the Swedish Singles Chart. There was also an English version of the song entitles "(You Are So) Yeah Yeah Wow Wow".

He also took part in Melodifestivalen 2002 with the song "Du och jag (i hela världen)", but was eliminated from first round finishing seventh in day 2 of the competition. In 2003, he formed a Swedish rock band called Nina Rochelle

Author
Martin Svensson also began a career as a writer with Hej! Mitt namn var Elton Persson (Hello! My name vas Elton Persson) followed up by Din heder (Meryem's honour) in 2009.

Personal life
Svensson was born in Kalmar, Sweden.  He moved to Varberg in 1981.

In 1998, Svensson met Swedish-Kurdish pop singer Dilbihar Demirbag known as Dilba at a party, and they later married in the summer of 2000. A divorce was filed in 2002.

Discography

Solo

Albums

Singles

With Nina Rochelle
Albums
2003: Om Sverige vill ha det så
2005: Mörkertal
2006: Måndagsfolket

Singles
2003: "Taxi 43"
2003: "(Happy) Jag hatar att det är så"
2004: "Stockholm kommer förstöra mig"
2005: "Mörkertal"
2005: "Rött ljus"
2006: "Måndagsfolket"

Bibliography
Novels
2007: Hej! Mitt namn var Elton Persson
2009: Din hederChildren / Youth
2010: När inget annat hjälper2011: Musik för tondöva2012: Knacka tre gånger och andra spöhistorier2013: Min första bakbok2013: Glutenfritt är gott2014: Julius och pusskalaset2014: Julius spelar teater2015: Julius på solsemester2015: Julius och mobbarna2015: Bästa lekboken2016: Vad är grejen med kroppen?2016: Julius firar jul2016: Sanningen om Dixie del 12016: Sanningen om Dixie del 22017: Sanningen om Dixie del 3Editing and narration
2016: Skattarkammarön2016: Robin Hood2017: Varghunden2017: Trollkarlen från OzJoint books
2011: Dingo Dingo - Den manliga frigörelsen (with Bob Hansson and Leif Eriksson)
2014: Johannes Brost Dö inte nyfiken (with Johannes Brost and Leif Eriksson)
2015: 501 svenska platser du måste se innan du dör (with Leif Eriksson)
2016: Alexander Gustafsson – The Mauler (with Alexander Gustafsson and Leif Eriksson)
2017: 101 svenska öar du måste se innan du dör (with Leif Eriksson)
2017: Samantha Fox – Min berättelse (with Samantha Fox and Leif Eriksson)
2017: Joakim Lundell – Monster'' (with Joakim Lundell and Leif Eriksson)

References

External links
Martin Svensson Official website 
Martin Svensson MySpace site

1978 births
Living people
21st-century Swedish singers
21st-century Swedish male singers
Melodifestivalen contestants of 2002
Melodifestivalen contestants of 1999